South Korean singer Onew has released two studio albums, three extended plays, thirteen singles (including three as a featured artist) and ten soundtrack songs. Onew began his music career in 2008 as a member of the boy band Shinee. He made his debut as a solo artist in 2018 with the release of his extended play Voice, which peaked at number two on the Gaon Album Chart. His second extended play, Dice, followed in 2022. It peaked at number three on the Gaon Album Chart and has sold over 140,000 copies in South Korea. Later that year, Onew released his first Japanese-language extended play, Who Sings? Vol.1, which formed part of his debut studio album, Life Goes On. In 2023, he released his first Korean studio album Circle.

Albums

Studio albums

Extended plays

Singles

As lead artist

As featured artist

Soundtrack appearances

Other appearances

Songwriting credits
All songwriting credits are adapted from the Korea Music Copyright Association's database, unless otherwise noted.

Videography

Video albums

Music videos

Soundtrack videos

Guest appearances

Other music videos

Notes

References

Discographies of South Korean artists
K-pop discographies